Rafael Cobos López (born 1973) is a Spanish screenwriter and playwright. He is a recurring co-scribe of Alberto Rodríguez's films. He has won two Goya Awards (for Marshland and Smoke & Mirrors).

Biography 
Rafael Cobos López was born in 1973 in Seville. After starting studies in medicine, he dropped out and switched to a degree in audiovisual communication.

Together with Rodríguez, Cobos has penned the screenplays of the films 7 Virgins (2005), After, Marshland (2014), Smoke & Mirrors (2016), Prison 77 (2022) and the television series La peste.

He has also participated in the writing of Kike Maíllo's Toro (2016).

References 

1973 births
21st-century Spanish screenwriters
Spanish male screenwriters
Spanish dramatists and playwrights
Living people